Amy Woolard is an American attorney and poet. She won the 2018 Alice James Prize. She won the 2015 1/2 K Prize,

She is director of policy of the Legal Aid Justice Center. She is an advocate for criminal justice reform in Virginia.

Early life 
She graduated from the University of Virginia, where she studied with Gregory Orr in the University of Virginia School of Law.

Career 
Her work appeared in Virginia Quarterly Review, The Rumpus, Guernica, Ploughshares, Gulf Coast, Colorado Review, Fence, Slate,  The New Yorker, and The Paris Review.

Works

References

External links 

 

What's the Ideal Day Job for a Poet? - The Atlantic

American lawyers
21st-century American poets
American women poets
Year of birth missing (living people)
Living people
University of Virginia alumni
University of Virginia School of Law alumni
21st-century American women